The Crystal Spring springsnail, scientific name Pyrgulopsis crystalis, is a species of small freshwater snail, an aquatic gastropod mollusk in the family Hydrobiidae.

This species' natural habitat is springs.  It is endemic to Crystal Pool, Ash Meadows, Nevada, United States.

Description
Its differentiated from other Pyrgulopsis in that its penial filament has an absent lobe and elongate filament with the penial ornament consisting of a large, superficial ventral gland.

References

Molluscs of the United States
Pyrgulopsis
Gastropods described in 1987
Taxonomy articles created by Polbot